B49 or B-49 may refer to:
 Bundesstraße 49, a German road
 B49 (New York City bus) in Brooklyn in the United States
 HLA-B49, an HLA-B serotype
 A postcode area in Alcester, Warwickshire, England
 Northrop YB-49, an American aircraft
 B-49 (submarine), a Soviet Foxtrot class diesel-electric hunter-killer submarine
 Persiaran Mokhtar Dahari, in Selangor, Malaysia